The Montesinho Natural Park is a protected area located in the municipalities of Vinhais and Bragança, northeastern Portugal. Sections of the southern slopes of the Serra da Coroa (Sierra de la Culebra) fall within the park.

It has a varied avifauna (more than 120 species of breeding birds), including the presence of 70% of terrestrial animal species that occur in Portugal, with emphasis on one of the most important Iberian wolf populations. In 2019 a Cantabrian brown bear was sighted. The ichthyofauna (fish) includes the Northern straight-mouth nase, Luciobarbus bocagei and the brown trout.

Shale dominates the landscape but there are also limestone stains in plateau areas and granite in the Montesinho mountain range. Native trees include Prunus avium, Ulmus minor, Corylus avellana, Malus sylvestris, Quercus pyrenaica, among others. It is the only place in Portugal where Euonymus europaeus can be found naturally.

The government of Portugal maintains a registry and facilitates placement of Cão de Gado Transmontano for flock and wolf protection through its agency, Parque Natural de Montesinho.

Notes

External links
Birdwatching

Nature parks in Portugal
Nature conservation in Portugal
Geography of Bragança District
Tourist attractions in Bragança District
Natura 2000 in Portugal